Wenceslau Braz is a Brazilian municipality in the state of Minas Gerais. As of 2020, its population was estimated to be 2,548.

References

Municipalities in Minas Gerais